Leopoldo Fossati (born 12 July 1948) is an Argentine sports shooter. He competed in the men's 25 metre rapid fire pistol event at the 1984 Summer Olympics.

References

1948 births
Living people
Argentine male sport shooters
Olympic shooters of Argentina
Shooters at the 1984 Summer Olympics
Place of birth missing (living people)